The 2023 ICC Women's T20 World Cup was the eighth edition of ICC Women's T20 World Cup tournament. It was held in South Africa between 10 February and 26 February 2023. The final took place at Cape Town. Australia won their sixth and third consecutive title after beating the hosts South Africa in the final by 19 runs.

Teams and qualification
In December 2020 the ICC confirmed the qualification process for the tournament. South Africa automatically qualified for the tournament as the hosts. They were joined by the seven highest ranked teams in the ICC Women's T20I Rankings, as of 30 November 2021, who competed at the 2020 ICC Women's T20 World Cup in Australia. The remaining two teams were Ireland and Bangladesh, the finalists of the qualifying tournament.

Squads

Each team selected a squad of 15 players before the tournament, and was able to replace any injured players. Pakistan were the first to name their squad on 14 December 2022.

Venues
In August 2022, the ICC announced that three venues in three cities would host matches. The venues were Newlands Cricket Ground, St George's Park and Boland Park.

Match officials
On 27 January 2023, the ICC appointed the all-woman panel of match officials for the tournament. Along with the ten umpires, G. S. Lakshmi, Shandre Fritz and Michell Pereira were also named as the match referees.

Match Referees
  Shandre Fritz
  G. S. Lakshmi
  Michell Pereira

Umpires

  Lauren Agenbag
  Kim Cotton
  Anna Harris
  Narayanan Janani
  Nimali Perera
  Claire Polosak
  Vrinda Rathi
  Sue Redfern
  Eloise Sheridan
  Jacqueline Williams

Prize money
The total prize money purse of US$2,450,000 was available for the tournament and was allocated according to the performance of the team as follows:

Warm-up matches
Before the T20 World Cup, the participating nations competed in ten warm-up matches, which were played from 6 February to 8 February 2023. These matches did not have either Women's Twenty20 International (WT20I) status or WT20 status.

Group stage
The ICC released the fixture details on 3 October 2022.

Group 1

Group 2

Knockout stage

Semi-finals

Final

Statistics

South Africa's Laura Wolvaardt was the leading run-scorer in the tournament, with 230 runs. England's Sophie Ecclestone, was the leading wicket-taker, finishing with eleven dismissals.

Team of the tournament
On 27 February 2023, ICC announced its team of the tournament picked by a selection panel featuring Ian Bishop, Anjum Chopra, Lisa Sthalekar, Mel Jones, Nasser Hussain, Ebony Rainford-Brent and Mpumelelo Mbangwa.

  Tazmin Brits
  Alyssa Healy (wk)
  Laura Wolvaardt
  Nat Sciver-Brunt (c)
  Ashleigh Gardner
  Richa Ghosh
  Sophie Ecclestone
  Karishma Ramharack
  Shabnim Ismail
  Darcie Brown
  Megan Schutt
  Orla Prendergast (12th woman)

References

External links
 Tournament home at ESPNcricinfo

 
International cricket competitions in 2022–23
Women's T20 World Cup
T20 World Cup
T20 World Cup
Women's T20 World Cup
International women's cricket competitions in South Africa